Chuck Hughes (born December 31, 1976) is a Canadian chef, television personality, and restaurateur. He is the chef and co-owner of Garde Manger and Le Bremner, located in Old Montréal, with partners Tim Rozon and Kyle Marshall Nares. Hughes fluently speaks both English and French.

Biography 
He became a celebrity chef as the host of the English-language cooking series Chuck's Day Off on the Food Network in Canada and on Cooking Channel in the United States. Since then, he has hosted a travel and cooking show called Chuck's Week Off: Mexico, and Chuck's Eat The Street, where he explores foods along a street in cities around the United States.

Hughes competed on the American cooking show, Iron Chef America, defeating Iron Chef Bobby Flay, becoming the youngest Canadian chef to win, and only the third to do so. He was a competitor on Food Network's The Next Iron Chef: Super Chefs competition.

In 2014, Hughes was a recurring judge on season one of Chopped Canada. He is also the co-host of Casas À couteaux tirés, a French-language cooking competition show, based somewhat on the American series Knife Fight.

Filmography

References

External links 
 
 
 Chuck and the First Peoples' Kitchen

1976 births
Living people
Anglophone Quebec people
Canadian male chefs
Canadian restaurateurs
Canadian television chefs
Chefs from Montreal
Food Network chefs
Television personalities from Montreal